Ladies' Night was the second novel written, but tenth published by Jack Ketchum. The novel is reminiscent of survival movies such as Night of the Living Dead and Dawn of the Dead since it deals with survival in extreme urban circumstances. Initially deemed too graphic to publish, the novel, written in the early 1980s at a length of approximately 400 pages, was finally released in 1997 at a length of 175 pages by Silver Salamander Press.

Plot

The novel takes place in New York City, where a chemical truck gets into an accident and spills its contents on the street.  Curiously, the trucker has fake identification, and no one seems to have heard of the company name on the truck:  "Ladies, INC."

Later that evening, Tom Braun and his family go to a party.  Tom gets into a shouting match with his wife, Susan, which their son, Andy, overhears. Andy retreats to his room to pack for a scout camping trip. After Tom leaves the apartment for the night, the women of New York who inhaled the spilled chemicals (including Susan) begin to have severe headaches.  Within a short time, the women are overcome by a desire to have sex with any man they can find.  Finally, the women begin attacking those who have not been similarly affected by the spilled chemicals. In increasingly gruesome scenes, women kill their children, husbands, brothers, etc., and the seemingly few unaffected women of the city.

As Tom works with a small band of men to make it home to Andy, Susan first tries to mate with her son, then tries to kill him. Andy hides in a bathroom until an unaffected woman unknowingly saves his life by knocking on the door. The woman is subsequently attacked by Susan and other crazed women. Tom is wounded on his journey home, but manages to severely injure his wife before she can kill their son. Susan then kills Tom, whereupon Andy shoots his mom with several arrows (which he had for his camping trip) to make sure she is not able to recover from her injuries.

References

External links
 Reviews

2000 American novels
Novels by Jack Ketchum
Novels set in New York City